Kabondo is a settlement in Kenya's Homa Bay County.

References 

Populated places in Nyanza Province
Homa Bay County